Gao Yihan (高一涵, P: Gāo Yīhán, W: Kao I-han, 1884–1968) was a Chinese intellectual and political scientist. In addition to holding both educational and governmental positions, he contributed often to the publications The Tiger and New Youth (Xin Qingnian) and is thereby associated with the New Culture Movement.

Biography
In 1916, Gao Yihan graduated from Meiji University. Afterward he served as editor for the publications Morning Bell and Weekly Commentary. In addition to teaching political science at Peking University, he was a professor at Beijing University and a Law School dean at Nanjing University. His writing was often concerned with the nature of the state. He felt that a state should not be considered an inevitability and instead should be recognized as a construction of the people. He was disappointed in the nature of the state in China at the time, notably the rampant warlordism.

The ultimate goal of the state, Gao Yihan thought, should be to secure and protect individual rights. He greatly admired certain philosophies and politics of the west, notably Utilitarianism, and was also an individualist. His work for the Bureau of Translation in the Ministry of the Interior allowed him to compare governments in Britain, the United States, France, and Japan. In 1930 he published a comparative political textbook which included material from his past lectures.

Gao Yihan was a respected member of The Tiger for his contributions and he contributed a large number of them while the journal was still in its early stages. Gao Yihan's leanings were decidedly socialistic and he was in fact one of the first Chinese intellectuals to encourage the proliferation of economic rights. After the dissolution of The Tiger, Gao Yihan, like many of contemporaries, went on to write similarly for La Jeunesse.

Notes

References
Weston, Timothy B. "The Formation and Positioning of the New Culture Community, 1913-1917." Fire Technology 24.3 (1998): 255-284. Print.
Angle, Stephen C., and Marina Svensson, ed. The Chinese Human Rights Reader: Documents and Commentary, 1900-2000. London: M. E. Sharpe, 2001. Print.
Lin, Xiaoqing Diana. Peking University: Chinese Scholarship and Intellectuals, 1898-1937. Albany: State University of New York Press, 2005. Print.
Ogden, Suzanne. Inklings of Democracy in China. Cambridge: Harvard University Asia Center, 2002. Print.
Waldron, Arthur. "Warlordism versus Federalism: The Revival of a Debate?" The China Quarterly 121 (1990): 116-128. Web. 25 April 2010.
Waldron, Arthur. "The Warlord: Twentieth-Century Chinese Understandings of Violence, Militarism, and Imperialism." The American Historical Review 96.4 (1991): 116-128. Web. 25 April 2010.

1884 births
1968 deaths
Chinese political scientists
Academic staff of Peking University
Academic staff of Nanjing University
Meiji University alumni
20th-century political scientists